Glaucocharis auriscriptella is a moth in the family Crambidae. It was first described by Francis Walker in 1864 using the name Eromene auriscriptella. It is endemic to New Zealand. The adult moth is on the wing from November to February. It has been found in wetland habitat.  

The larvae likely feed on mosses.

References

Diptychophorini
Moths described in 1864
Moths of New Zealand
Endemic fauna of New Zealand
Taxa named by Francis Walker (entomologist)
Endemic moths of New Zealand